The history of beer in Edinburgh is perhaps the lengthiest of any region of Scotland.
Throughout the history of Edinburgh, brewing takes its place as one of the most important and oldest industries. The origin of brewing goes back to the 12th century monks of Holyrood Abbey, who took advantage of the clear spring water for the production of their ale.
The brewing industry certainly contributed to Edinburgh's earned moniker of "Auld Reekie" so named due to all the smoke produced by coal and wood burning furnaces and boilers. This is evidenced by the fact that at the turn of the 20th century, Edinburgh had no less than thirty-five breweries churning out this smoke from its maltings and brewhouses. This haze may not have been so noticeable were it not for the density of the buildings and population in such proximity.
There are two lists below, one for defunct and one for operational breweries & microbreweries in Edinburgh.

Operational breweries

Closed breweries

See also 

List of breweries in Scotland

References 

Edinburgh
History of Edinburgh
Tourism in Edinburgh